John Flamank or Flamoke (by 1486 – 1535/41), of Boscarne, near Bodmin, Cornwall, was an English politician.

Ancestry

He was the son of Richard Flamank and Jane, daughter of Thomas Luccombe of Bodmin. His elder brother was Thomas Flamank, co-leader of the Cornish Rebellion of 1497.

Career and life
John served as a man-at-arms at Calais in 1507 before acting as Member of Parliament (MP) for Bodmin in 1515.

He was a Commissioner of Subsidy for Cornwall in 1523 and was appointed Mayor of Bodmin in 1525 and 1534.

In 1526 he served as a Yeoman Usher in the Royal Household and as Usher of the Kings Chamber in 1538.

Flamank died in 1540.

Family and descendants
John married Jane, daughter of Sir Richard Nanfan, Deputy Lieutenant of Calais and Esquire of the King's Body. They had the following issue:

 Gilbert Flamank, MP for Bodmin in 1529
 John Flamank
 Henry Flamank
 Roger Flamank

References

15th-century births
16th-century deaths
English MPs 1515
Members of the Parliament of England for Bodmin